Giovanni Battista Bagalà Blasini (6 April 1803 – 2 March 1884) was a Roman Catholic prelate who served as Bishop of Grosseto (1876–1884).

Biography
Giovanni Battista Bagalà Blasini was born in Livorno. He served as auxiliary bishop of Livorno (1868–1876), for which office he had been appointed titular bishop of Cydonia (Crete). He was transferred to the diocese of Grosseto by Pope Pius IX on 3 April 1876. He died on 1 March 1884.

References

Sources

Minucci, Giotto (1988). La città di Grosseto e i suoi vescovi (498-1988) [The city of Grosseto and its bishops (498-1988)]. Florence: Lucio Pugliese.

External links
 (for Chronology of Bishops) 
 (for Chronology of Bishops)  

19th-century Italian Roman Catholic bishops
1803 births
1884 deaths
People from Livorno
Bishops of Grosseto